György Mitró (6 March 1930 – 4 January 2010) was a Hungarian swimmer and Olympic medalist. He participated at the 1948 Summer Olympics, winning a silver medal in 4 × 200 metre freestyle relay, and a bronze medal in 1500 metre freestyle. He also became a European champion in 1500 metres freestyle swimming in 1947.

References

External links 
 
 

1930 births
2010 deaths
Hungarian male swimmers
Olympic swimmers of Hungary
Olympic silver medalists for Hungary
Olympic bronze medalists for Hungary
Swimmers at the 1948 Summer Olympics
Olympic bronze medalists in swimming
Hungarian male freestyle swimmers
European Aquatics Championships medalists in swimming
Medalists at the 1948 Summer Olympics
Olympic silver medalists in swimming